Ri Hyang-ok (born 18 December 1977) is a North Korean association football referee and former footballer. She played as a midfielder and was a member of the North Korea women's national football team. She was part of the team at the 1999 FIFA Women's World Cup and 2003 FIFA Women's World Cup. Since 2005 she has been a FIFA listed referee, and was chosen to officiate at the 2019 FIFA Women's World Cup in France.

International goals

References

1977 births
Living people
North Korean women's footballers
North Korea women's international footballers
Place of birth missing (living people)
1999 FIFA Women's World Cup players
2003 FIFA Women's World Cup players
Women's association football midfielders
Footballers at the 1998 Asian Games
Footballers at the 2002 Asian Games
North Korean football referees
Women association football referees
FIFA Women's World Cup referees
Asian Games gold medalists for North Korea
Asian Games silver medalists for North Korea
Asian Games medalists in football
Medalists at the 1998 Asian Games
Medalists at the 2002 Asian Games